DDT 9th Anniversary: Judgement 10 was a professional wrestling event promoted by DDT Pro-Wrestling (DDT). It took place on March 5, 2006, in Tokyo, Japan, at the Shinjuku Face. It was the tenth event under the Judgement name. The event aired domestically on Fighting TV Samurai.

Storylines
Judgement 10 featured six professional wrestling matches that involved different wrestlers from pre-existing scripted feuds and storylines. Wrestlers portrayed villains, heroes, or less distinguishable characters in the scripted events that built tension and culminated in a wrestling match or series of matches.

Event
The first match was a Rumble rules match dubbed "Jet Rumble" in which each contestant wore gloves and a fake beard.

Next was a match dubbed "Mikami's 10 Years Memorial Match" to celebrate the 10th anniversary of Mikami's pro-wrestling career.

Results

References

External links
The official DDT Pro-Wrestling website

10
2006 in professional wrestling
Professional wrestling in Tokyo